Mikael Soisalo (born 24 April 1998) is a Finnish professional footballer who plays as a right-winger for Latvian club Riga FC. He has also represented the Finland national under-21 football team. Soisalo was born in Helsinki, Finland. He began his senior club career on league level playing for Ilves, before signing with Zulte Waregem at age 20 in 2018.

Club career

Klubi 04

He started his career playing for in the lower leagues of Finnish football in HJKs reserve team. He has also played for the junior teams of Finland national football team.

Ilves

On 14 December 2015 it was announced he had joined Ilves a team from Tampere on a 3-year contract.

He stated that his goal for the 2016 Veikkausliiga (Finnish 1 tier) season would be to get a start in the starting line-up.  He played an active role in the team's success, they finished fourth in the league and at times they even fought for the championship.

Middlesbrough
On 5 January 2017, Soisalo joined Middlesbrough on a three-year deal.

On 13 March 2017, he scored a hat-trick for the Middlesbrough reserves against Blackburn reserves. The manager praised him for his performance and how he had integrated into the team.

Zulte Waregem
On 18 June 2018, Middlesbrough announced that Soisalo was to join Belgian side Zulte Waregem after just one full season with Middlesbrough's U-23 side.

Soisalo was loaned out to Portuguese club Varzim S.C. on 29 January 2020 for the rest of the season with a purchase option. However, he only played two games for the club and returned to Zulte in the summer 2020.

Riga FC

For the 2021 season, Soisalo moved to Riga FC on a 2-year contract. He made his debut on 13 March, playing the first 65 minutes of a 0–2 win at Ventspils. He had an impressive start and had scored seven goals in 15 games in July 2021.

International career
He has been an integral part of the various youth national teams starting from the U-15. During 2016, he took part in Finland's qualifying campaign for the UEFA under 19 Championship. He played well against Kazakhstan, scoring once and assisting three goals. He scored his first goal for Finland U21 on 9 October 2020 in a UEFA European U21 Championship qualification match in Ballymena Showgrounds, Ballymena against Northern Ireland U21.

In March 2022, Soisalo received a first call up for the Finland senior squad for the first time, coming into the squad after the withdrawal of Lassi Lappalainen and Onni Valakari for matches against Iceland and Slovakia.

Career statistics

Club

Honours

Club

Klubi 04
Kakkonen Eastern Group: 2015

Individual
Veikkausliiga Breakthrough of the Year: 2016
Veikkausliiga Team of the Year: 2016

References

External links 

 SV Zulte Waregem official profile
 Mikael Soisalo – SPL competition record  
 

1998 births
Living people
Association football forwards
Finnish footballers
Finnish expatriate footballers
Finland under-21 international footballers
Finland youth international footballers
Kakkonen players
Veikkausliiga players
Belgian Pro League players
Liga Portugal 2 players
Latvian Higher League players
FC Ilves players
Middlesbrough F.C. players
S.V. Zulte Waregem players
Varzim S.C. players
Riga FC players
Footballers from Helsinki
Expatriate footballers in Belgium
Expatriate footballers in England
Expatriate footballers in Portugal
Expatriate footballers in Latvia
Finnish expatriate sportspeople in England
Finnish expatriate sportspeople in Belgium
Finnish expatriates in Portugal
Finnish expatriate sportspeople in Latvia